Oemopteryx is a genus of winter stoneflies in the family Taeniopterygidae. There are about six described species in Oemopteryx.

Species
These six species belong to the genus Oemopteryx:
 Oemopteryx contorta (Needham & Claassen, 1925) (dark willowfly)
 Oemopteryx fosketti (Ricker, 1965)
 Oemopteryx glacialis (Newport, 1849) (Canadian willowfly)
 Oemopteryx leei Baumann & Kondratieff, 2009
 Oemopteryx loewii (Albarda, 1889)
 Oemopteryx vanduzeea (Claassen, 1937)

References

Further reading

External links

 

Taeniopterygidae
Articles created by Qbugbot